The Middlesex Guildhall is the home of the Supreme Court of the United Kingdom and of the Judicial Committee of the Privy Council. It stands on the south-west corner of Parliament Square in London. It is a Grade II* listed building.

Constructed beginning in 1906 in what has been called "art nouveau gothic" style, initially the Guildhall served as an administrative and court centre for Middlesex County Council. That was abolished in 1965, and it later served as a Crown Court building until the establishment of the Supreme Court in the early 21st century.

History

The site on the south-west corner of Parliament Square was originally the belfry of Westminster Abbey. The first guildhall, designed as an octagon with a Doric portico by Samuel Pepys Cockerell, was built for the justices of the City and Liberty of Westminster and opened as the "Westminster Sessions House" or "Westminster Guildhall" in 1805.

In 1889 Westminster became part of the County of London, outside of the jurisdiction of the county of Middlesex. In the division of property between the Middlesex and London county councils, the guildhall at Westminster went to Middlesex in exchange for the Sessions House in Clerkenwell which went to London. In addition to being a facility for dispensing justice, following the implementation of the Local Government Act 1888, which established county councils in every county, the guildhall also became the administrative headquarters and meeting place for Middlesex County Council.

Middlesex county leaders decided, in the context of their increased responsibilities, that the first guildhall was inadequate for their purposes, and a second guildhall, designed by F. H. Pownall in the neo-Tudor style, was constructed on the site in 1893.

After the county leaders found that the second guildhall was actually too small, the current and third guildhall, designed by J. S. Gibson in what Pevsner called an "art nouveau gothic" style, was built between 1906 and 1913. The design involved a symmetrical main frontage of nine bays facing Parliament Square; the central section of three bays which slightly projected forwards, featured an ornate arched doorway with a segmental arched window spanning the first and second floors and a tower above. A 17th century door, which had originally been part of the Tothill Fields Bridewell prison, was installed in the basement of the building. The building was decorated with medieval-style gargoyles and other architectural sculptures by Henry Charles Fehr.

Following the implementation of the London Government Act 1963, Middlesex County Council and the Middlesex sessions were abolished in 1965, but the guildhall continued to be used by the Greater London Quarter Sessions. After the abolition of the Quarter Sessions in 1972, it was used as a venue of the Crown Court.

The Middlesex Guildhall was closed for refurbishment in 2007 to convert it for use as the site of the new Supreme Court of the United Kingdom and the Judicial Committee of the Privy Council. The Supreme Court, established in law by the Constitutional Reform Act 2005, started operations on 1 October 2009.

Controversy over conversion

After the government chose the Middlesex Guildhall as home for the new Supreme Court, it was realised that a great deal of work was required to renovate the building and adapt it to the new use. Renovation plans were developed by architects Feilden+Mawson LLP, supported by Foster & Partners.

Conservation groups were concerned that the planned conversion would be unsympathetic to such an important historic building. The Middlesex Guildhall is a Grade II* listed building, and the statement of importance by English Heritage classed the three main Court interiors as "unsurpassed by any other courtroom of the period in terms of the quality and completeness of their fittings" on 26 August 2004. The conversion works involved the removal of many of the original fixtures and fittings. Save Britain's Heritage unsuccessfully contested the conversion.

See also
Guild

References

Further reading
The Supreme Court of the United Kingdom: History, Art, Architecture Chris Miele ed. (Merrell)

External links

Middlesex Guildhall profile from the Supreme Court of the United Kingdom's official website
In pictures: UK Supreme Court

Art Nouveau architecture in London
Art Nouveau government buildings
Government buildings completed in 1913
County halls in England
Court buildings in England
Edwardian architecture in London
Grade II* listed buildings in the City of Westminster
Guildhall
Judicial Committee of the Privy Council
Legal buildings in London
Local government buildings in London
National government buildings in London
Parliament Square
Supreme Court of the United Kingdom
Works by James Glen Sivewright Gibson
1913 establishments in England
National supreme court buildings